Ugur Jahangirov (born 22 September 2001) is an Azerbaijani footballer who plays as a forward for Shamakhi in the Azerbaijan Premier League.

Club career
On 7 August 2022, Jahangirov made his debut in the Azerbaijan Premier League for Shamakhi match against Neftçi.

References

External links
 

2001 births
Living people
Association football forwards
Azerbaijani footballers
Azerbaijan Premier League players
Shamakhi FK players